Emily Kimbrough (October 23, 1899 – February 10, 1989) was an American author and journalist.

Biography
Emily Kimbrough was born in Muncie, Indiana. In 1921 she graduated from Bryn Mawr College and went on a trip to Europe with her friend Cornelia Otis Skinner. The two friends co-authored the memoir Our Hearts Were Young and Gay based on their European adventures. The success of the book as a New York Times best seller led to Kimbrough and Skinner going to Hollywood to work on a script for the movie version. Kimbrough wrote about the experience in We Followed Our Hearts to Hollywood.

Kimbrough's journalistic career included an editor post at Fashions of the Hour, managing editorship at the Ladies Home Journal and a host of articles in Country Life, House & Garden, Travel, Reader's Digest, Saturday Review of Literature, and Parents magazines.

Kimbrough's Through Charley's Door (published 1952) is an autobiographical narrative of her experiences in Marshall Field's Advertising Bureau. Hired in November 1923 as the researcher and writer for the department store's quarterly catalog, Fashions of the Hour, Kimbrough was later promoted to editor of the publication. In 1926, she was recruited by Barton Curry with Ladies' Home Journal, and left Marshall Field's to become Ladies' Home Journal's fashion editor, a position she held until 1929. Between 1929 and 1952, Kimbrough was a freelance writer, with articles published in The New Yorker and Atlantic Monthly among others. In 1952, she joined WCBS Radio. She died February 10, 1989, at her home in Manhattan.

Bibliography
Our Hearts Were Young and Gay (with Cornelia Otis Skinner, 1942)
We Followed Our Hearts to Hollywood (1943)
How Dear to My Heart (1944)
...It Gives Me Great Pleasure (1948)
The Innocents from Indiana (1950)
Through Charley's Door (1952)
Forty Plus and Fancy Free (1954)
So Near and Yet So Far (1955)
Water, Water, Everywhere (1956)
And a Right Good Crew (1958)
Pleasure by the Busload (1961)
Forever Old, Forever New (1964)
Floating Island (1968), a description of a two-week voyage in France from Samoisa to Montbard via rivers and canals, using a converted barge called the Palinurus
Now and Then (1972)
Time Enough (1974)
Better than Oceans (1976)

Books adapted for television
In 1950 The Girls, a short-lived television series based on her Our Hearts Were Young and Gay novel was telecast, with Mary Malone playing Kimbrough.
In 1957 The Eve Arden Show, a television series based on Kimbrough's book It Gives Me Great Pleasure, aired for one season.

Personal life

In the book Floating Island, Kimbrough mentions that she had kept her "unmarried name professionally"  and that she had daughters and grandchildren.

References 

1899 births
1989 deaths
American women novelists
Novelists from Indiana
People from Muncie, Indiana
Bryn Mawr College alumni
20th-century American novelists
20th-century American women writers
American women radio journalists
Journalists from Indiana
Ladies' Home Journal editors
20th-century American journalists